Birgitta Larsson (born 4 October 1941) is a Swedish orienteering competitor. She won two world titles as a member of Swedish relay teams in 1970 and 1974; in 1972 she won an individual bronze and a team silver medal. She continued winning medals at world championships through the 2000s in the masters category.

Larsson started competing in 1961. She has seven siblings, three of whom also compete in orienteering, together with her husband and 13-14 nephews and nieces. She is a cartographer by profession.

References

1941 births
Living people
Swedish orienteers
Female orienteers
Foot orienteers
World Orienteering Championships medalists